Ahmad Jarba, born in the city of Qamishli in 1969, is a Syrian opposition member and former political prisoner. He is a public opponent of Bashar al-Assad and between 6 July 2013 and 11 July 2014 he was President of the Syrian National Coalition, which is the main coalition of opposition groups in the Syrian Civil War, as well as being a member of the Syrian National Council. His election took place in the second round of voting of a three days meeting organized by the Coalition in order to renew its board. He obtained 55 votes, three more than his rival Mustafa Sabbagh, who was supported by Qatar. According to a July 2013 article in The Economist, "there is little reason to believe he will wield more influence than his predecessor, Moaz al-Khatib." Jarba was re-elected on 5 January 2014, with 65 votes, defeating his only opponent Riyad Farid Hijab by 13 votes.

Jarba is the president of the Syria's Tomorrow Movement, a member of the Shammar tribe.

On 13 September Ahmad Jarba met with the leader of the Movement for a Democratic Society, representing the de facto autonomous administration of the Federation of Northern Syria - Rojava, in order to form an agreement to participate in the governing of northeastern Syria. They issued a joint statement that "the monist powers insisting on one party, one flag and one nation are doomed to fail, and peoples are trying to realize their dreams for a democratic, pluralist and united Syria." By extension his forces the al-Nukhbat Brigade also joined the Syrian Democratic Forces.

References 

1969 births
American University of Beirut alumni
Living people
People from Qamishli
Syrian National Council members
Syrian Sunni Muslims
National Coalition of Syrian Revolutionary and Opposition Forces members